Peter Nicolas Sainthill (by 1524 – 1571) was an English politician.

He was a Member (MP) of the Parliament of England for Grampound in 1547 and for Saltash in April 1554.

References

1571 deaths
Members of the pre-1707 English Parliament for constituencies in Cornwall
Year of birth uncertain
English MPs 1554